Tollcross is an area north of the River Clyde in Glasgow and has a popular park, opened in 1897, which is famed for its international rose trials. It lies approximately a mile east of the neighbouring suburb of Parkhead, and just north of Braidfauld and south of Shettleston.

History
The area was once host to mass employment in the industrial age thanks largely to the large Fullarton steel works (now occupied by housing). McVitie's biscuit factory is one of the main employers in the area today, with a facility in the area since the 1920s.

Many residents of the Lilybank housing estate would consider themselves residents of Tollcross, but they, like the biscuit factory, were officially placed within the separate Braidfauld Ward of Glasgow City Council until its reorganisation in 2007; since then, Maukinfauld Road has been the local administrative boundary, with land to the west in the Calton ward and land to the east in Shettleston ward along with the rest of Tollcross.

Part of the Tollcross area was formerly known as Egypt, and is still marked so on a number of maps; the name is believed to have been derived from a farm that existed at one time in the vicinity, operated by a former soldier who had been stationed in Egypt. The farm, owned by the Gordon family in 1920s before being sold to the Hamilton family.

The poet William Miller, author of "Wee Willie Winkie", is buried in Tollcross.

In June 2011, pupils from St. Aidan's and St. Joan of Arc School combined into a new school located on Fullarton Avenue. They voted to call the new school Cardinal Winning, after Thomas Winning, the late Archbishop of Glasgow who died in 2001; the new school opened on 21 June 2011.

Just south of the school is Fullarton Park, home to the local football club Vale of Clyde, and the Tollcross Bowling Club adjacent to a modern retail park on London Road.

Tollcross Park and Winter Gardens

 was built in 1848 for James Dunlop who was one of the owners of the Clyde Iron Works. David Bryce and William Burn were the architects and the building replaced a substantial house that the original owners of the estate, the Corbets, had occupied. In 1897 the house, now within the centre of the public park, became a Children's Museum and was converted into flats in 1989, then as accommodation for the elderly in 2003.

It opened in 1897, having been purchased by Glasgow Corporation from the Dunlop family. In 2008, Tollcross was voted the best park in Scotland with its children's farm based around the former main lodge building at its eastern side, the rose garden in the southern section (set out in 1986, which holds annual cultivation trials) playing fields in the north part and a secret garden area.

The Tollcross conservatories were originally erected in 1870 at Redholm in Ardrossan, North Ayrshire. Baillie A.G. MacDonald of Redholm gifted them to the Glasgow Corporation in 1898 as a gesture to commemorate his links with the area. They were carefully dismantled and re-erected at their present-day site. The Tollcross cast-iron Victorian conservatory (NS 63659 63721), is a B-Listed structure, known as the 'Winter Gardens'. It is Latin-cross shaped in layout, has two semicircular ends and is crowned with a dome. The scrolled cast iron buttresses are a notable feature.

The conservatory suffered storm damage in December 2010 and January 2011. The conservatory and associated building have been closed since that time. The Winter Gardens are on the 'register of buildings at risk in Scotland'.

The Winter Gardens underwent a £1.9 million refurbishment between 1998 and 2000 carried out by a partnership of the Heritage Lottery Fund, Historic Environment Scotland and Glasgow City Council. A tent-like extension was built that housed a cafe, toilets, etc. and after being closed for fourteen years the Winter Gardens were opened again in November 2000.

In 1997, the East End Leisure Centre in Tollcross Park became a feature of the area, featuring an Olympic-sized swimming pool which is used by the City of Glasgow Swim Team. It was renamed as the Tollcross International Swimming Centre and renovated to serve as the swimming venue of the 2014 Commonwealth Games held in the city.

Notable people
 

Tom Leslie (1884–1961), footballer

References
Notes

Sources and Bibliography
 Tollcross Park Heritage Trail. Land and Environmental Services. Glasgow City Council
 Williamson, E., Riches, A. and Higgs, M. (1990). The Buildings of Scotland : Glasgow. London : Yale University Press. .

External links

Video of the Winter Gardens in 2016.

Areas of Glasgow
Culture in Glasgow
Parks and commons in Glasgow
2014 Commonwealth Games venues
Types of garden
Greenhouses in the United Kingdom
Glass architecture
Category B listed buildings in Glasgow
Botanical gardens in Scotland
Gardens in Glasgow
1897 establishments in Scotland